Chicabnab is a Q'eqchi' Maya village within the San Juan Chamelco Municipality of the Alta Verapaz Department of Guatemala.

Economy
The main economy of Chicabnab is ecotourism. Tourists come for guided tours of the surrounding forests, where Quetzals are very common.

Transport
No roads lead directly into the village, but within a two-hour walk of the village buses can be taken to San Pedro Carchá.

References

Populated places in the Alta Verapaz Department